Stanley Ira Kutler (August 10, 1934 – April 7, 2015) was an American historian, best known for his lawsuit against the National Archives and Richard Nixon that won the release of tape recordings Nixon made during his White House years, particularly those in relation to the Watergate scandal.

Early life and education
Kutler was born in 1934 in Cleveland, Ohio, the son of Robert (a printer) and Zelda (Coffman) Kutler. He married Sandra J. Sachs in 1956, and they had four children. He attended Bowling Green State University (B.A., 1956) and Ohio State University (Ph.D., 1960). He was also a William Green fellow at Ohio State University, 1959-1960.

Academic career
He was an instructor in history at Pennsylvania State University (1960–1962) and then taught at San Diego State University (assistant professor 1962–1964); In 1964, he was hired in the Department of History at the University of Wisconsin—Madison associate professor 1964-1970, professor of history 1970–1994 and thereafter as professor emeritus), 5 https://www.latimes.com/local/obituaries/la-me-stanley-kutler-20150409-story.html

He has written widely in a number of fields of American history, concentrating on American constitutional history and the twentieth century. His earliest book was Judicial Power and Reconstruction Politics (University of Chicago Press, 1968). His other major books include The Wars of Watergate (Knopf, 1990); The American Inquisition (Hill & Wang, 1982), winner of the Silver Gavel Award, American Bar Association, 1983; Privilege and Creative Destruction: The Charles River Bridge Case (Norton, 1978; revised edition, 1989).

He has authored or edited more than half a dozen textbooks in various fields of American history. His scholarly articles have appeared in leading history and legal periodicals. Prominent among his published works are editing the new edition of the Dictionary of American History, a ten-volume work (Scribner's 2002), which was awarded the American Library Association Best Reference Book Award. He also edited the four-volume Encyclopedia of Twentieth-Century America (Scribner's, 1995) and The Encyclopedia of the Vietnam War (Scribner's, 1995). The Vietnam volume received the A.L.A.'s Best Reference Prize in 1996, and the 20th Century work was awarded the prize for the best reference work by the Association of Book Publishers.

Kutler's book Abuse of Power: The New Nixon Tapes (Free Press, 1997) stemmed from his successful lawsuit against the National Archives and Nixon to force the release of the long-suppressed audio recordings of many conversations that Nixon had secretly recorded during his time in the White House. In 2009, Kutler was accused of errors in editing and transcribing the tapes, which resulted in White House counsel John Dean being portrayed in a more favorable light than was warranted. Kutler denied the charges.

Kutler founded Reviews in American History and edited it from 1972 to 1997.

Kutler wrote op-ed pieces and reviews for many publications and appeared as an occasional commentator on National Public Radio, as well as Today, Nightline, and many other television programs. He also worked as a consultant on a number of film projects, including historical advisor for the Emmy-winning BBC documentary Watergate, and he was advisor for the Showtime film The Day Ronald Reagan Was Shot.

Honors
Kutler has been a Guggenheim Fellow, holder of the Garibaldi Chair in Political Science, University of Bologna, 1991, Distinguished Exchange Scholar (National Science Foundation) for China in 1982, and Fulbright 40th Anniversary Distinguished Lecturer, Peru, in 1987, Bicentennial Professor, Tel Aviv University, Israel, in 1984, and Fulbright Lecturer, Japan, 1977.

Death
In 2015, Kutler died in Fitchburg, Wisconsin aged 80. He is survived by his wife, his three children and seven grandchildren.

References

External links
 Stanley Kutler - Professor Emeritus. University of Wisconsin (archived 2013)

 Stanley Kutler. University of Wisconsin Law School. Accessed 2010-12-22.
 Centennial Alumni Awards -Stanley Kutler '56. Bowling Green State University. Accessed 2010-12-22.

1934 births
2015 deaths
Academic staff of Tel Aviv University
American historians
Jewish American historians
American male non-fiction writers
Bowling Green State University alumni
Ohio State University alumni
21st-century American Jews